Ankadimanga is a rural municipality in Analamanga Region, in the  Central Highlands of Madagascar. It belongs to the district of Antananarivo-Atsimondrano and its populations numbers to 9,526 in 2019. 

It is located at 12 km East from the capital Antananarivo.

References

Populated places in Analamanga